The War Damage Commission was a body set up by the British Government under the War Damage Act 1941 to pay compensation for war damage to land and buildings and " 'Fixed'  plant and machinery", throughout the United Kingdom. It was not responsible for the repairs themselves, which were carried out by local authorities or private contractors.

The Commission was chaired by Malcolm Trustram Eve, then by Sir Thomas Williams Phillips (1949–1959). It was headquartered at Devonshire House, Mayfair Place, Piccadilly, London, and operated out of sixteen Regional Offices:
Region No.1 – Northern (Newcastle upon Tyne): Durham, Northumberland, North Riding of Yorkshire
Region No.2 – North-Eastern (Leeds): East Riding of Yorkshire, West Riding of Yorkshire
Region No.3 – North Midland (Nottingham): Derbyshire, Leicestershire, Lincolnshire, Northamptonshire, Nottinghamshire, Rutland
Region No.4 – Eastern (Cambridge): Bedfordshire, Cambridgeshire, Essex (except areas covered by Regions 5A and 5B), Hertfordshire, Huntingdonshire, Norfolk, Suffolk
Region No.5A – North-West London (Acton)
Region No.5B – North-East London (Finsbury Square)
Region No.5C – South-East London (Euston Road)
Region No.5D – South-West London (Kingston upon Thames)
Region No.6 – Southern (Reading): Berkshire, Buckinghamshire, Dorset, Hampshire, Isle of Wight, Oxfordshire
Region No.7 – South-Western (Bristol): Cornwall, Devon, Gloucestershire, Isles of Scilly, Somerset, Wiltshire
Region No.8 – Wales (Cardiff)
Region No.9 – Midland (Birmingham): Herefordshire, Shropshire, Staffordshire, Warwickshire, Worcestershire
Region No.10 – North-Western (Manchester): Cheshire, Cumberland, Lancashire, Westmorland
Region No.11 – Scotland (Edinburgh)
Region No.12 – South-Eastern (Tunbridge Wells): Kent, Surrey, Sussex, except areas covered by Regions 5C and 5D
Region No.13 – Northern Ireland (Belfast)

References

External links 
 
 War Damage Commission and War Damage Office records, The National Archives

Government agencies established in 1941
United Kingdom home front during World War II
Defunct public bodies of the United Kingdom